Phosphorescence is a type of photoluminescence related to fluorescence. When exposed to light (radiation) of a shorter wavelength, a phosphorescent substance will glow, absorbing the light and reemitting it at a longer wavelength. Unlike fluorescence, a phosphorescent material does not immediately reemit the radiation it absorbs. Instead, a phosphorescent material absorbs some of the radiation energy and reemits it for a much longer time after the radiation source is removed.

In a general sense, there is no distinct boundary between the emission times of fluorescence and phosphorescence (i.e.: if a substance glows under a black light it is generally considered fluorescent, and if it glows in the dark it is often simply called phosphorescent). In a modern, scientific sense, the phenomena can usually be classified by the three different mechanisms that produce the light, and the typical timescales during which those mechanisms emit light. Whereas fluorescent materials stop emitting light within nanoseconds (billionths of a second) after the excitation radiation is removed, phosphorescent materials may continue to emit an afterglow ranging from a few microseconds to many hours after the excitation is removed.

There are two separate mechanisms that may produce phosphorescence, called triplet phosphorescence (or simply phosphorescence) and persistent phosphorescence (or persistent luminescence). The slower timescales of the reemission are associated with "forbidden" energy state transitions in quantum mechanics. As these transitions occur relatively slowly in certain materials, absorbed radiation is reemitted at a lower intensity, ranging from a few microseconds to as much as one second after the excitation is removed.

On the other hand, persistent phosphorescence occurs when a high-energy photon is absorbed by an atom and its electron becomes trapped in a defect in the lattice of the crystalline or amorphous material. A defect such as a missing atom (vacancy defect) can trap an electron like a pitfall, storing that electron's energy until released by a random spike of thermal (vibrational) energy. Such a substance will then emit light of gradually decreasing intensity, ranging from a few seconds to up to several hours after the original excitation.

Everyday examples of phosphorescent materials are the glow-in-the-dark toys, stickers, paint and clock dials that glow after being charged with a bright light such as in any normal reading or room light.  Typically, the glow slowly fades out, sometimes within a few minutes or up to a few hours in a dark room.

The study of phosphorescent materials led to the discovery of radioactive decay.

Etymology
The term phosphorescence comes from the ancient Greek word φῶς (phos), meaning "light", and the Greek suffix -φόρος (-phoros), meaning "to bear", combined with the Latin suffix -escentem, meaning "becoming of", "having a tendency towards", or "with the essence of". Thus, phosphorescence literally means "having a tendency to bear light". It was first recorded in 1766.

The term phosphor had been used since the Middle Ages to describe minerals that glowed in the dark. One of the most famous, but not the first, was Bolognian phosphor. Around 1604, Vincenzo Casciarolo discovered a "lapis solaris" near Bologna, Italy. Once heated in an oxygen-rich furnace, it thereafter absorbed sunlight and glowed in the dark. In 1677, Hennig Brand isolated a new element that glowed due to a chemiluminescent reaction when exposed to air, and named it "phosphorus".

In contrast, the term luminescence (from the Latin lumen for "light"), was coined by Eilhardt Wiedemann in 1888 as a term to refer to "light without heat", while "fluorescence" by Sir George Stokes in 1852, when he noticed that, when exposing a solution of quinine sulfate to light refracted through a prism, the solution glowed when exposed to the mysterious invisible-light (now known to be UV light) beyond the violet end of the spectrum. Stokes formed the term from a combination of fluorspar and opalescence (preferring to use a mineral instead of a solution), albeit it was later discovered that fluorspar glows due to phosphorescence.

There was much confusion between the meanings of these terms throughout the late nineteenth to mid-twentieth centuries. Whereas the term "fluorescence" tended to refer to luminescence that ceased immediately (by human-eye standards) when removed from excitation, "phosphorescence" referred to virtually any substance that glowed for appreciable periods in darkness, sometimes to include even chemiluminescence (which occasionally produced substantial amounts of heat). Only after the 1950s and 1960s did advances in quantum electronics, spectroscopy, and lasers provide a measure to distinguish between the various processes that emit the light, although in common speech the distinctions are still often rather vague.

Introduction

In simple terms, phosphorescence is a process in which energy absorbed by a substance is released relatively slowly in the form of light. This is in some cases the mechanism used for glow-in-the-dark materials which are "charged" by exposure to light. Unlike the relatively swift reactions in fluorescence, such as those seen in laser mediums like the common ruby, phosphorescent materials "store" absorbed energy for a longer time, as the processes required to reemit energy occur less often. However, timescale is still only a general distinction, as there are slow-emitting fluorescent materials, for example uranyl salts, and, likewise, some phosphorescent materials like zinc sulfide (in violet) are very fast. Scientifically, the phenomena are classified by the different mechanisms that produce the light, as materials that phosphoresce may be suitable for some purposes such as lighting, but may be completely unsuitable for others that require fluorescence, like lasers. Further blurring the lines, a substance may emit light by one, two, or all three mechanisms depending on the material and excitation conditions.

When the stored energy becomes locked in by the spin of the atomic electrons, a triplet state can occur, slowing the emission of light, sometimes by several orders of magnitude. Because the atoms usually begin in a singlet state of spin, favoring fluorescence, these types of phosphors typically produce both types of emission during illumination, and then a dimmer afterglow of strictly phosphorescent light typically lasting less than a second after the illumination is switched off.

Conversely, when the stored energy is due to persistent phosphorescence, an entirely different process occurs without a fluorescence precursor. When electrons become trapped within a defect in the atomic or molecular lattice, light is prevented from reemitting until the electron can escape. To escape, the electron needs a boost of thermal energy to help spring it out of the trap and back into orbit around the atom. Only then can the atom emit a photon. Thus, persistent phosphorescence is highly dependent on the temperature of the material.

Triplet phosphorescence

Most photoluminescent events, in which a chemical substrate absorbs and then re-emits a photon of light, are fast, in the order of 10 nanoseconds. Light is absorbed and emitted at these fast time scales in cases where the energy of the photons involved matches the available energy states and allowed transitions of the substrate.  In the special case of phosphorescence, the electron which absorbed the photon (energy) undergoes an unusual intersystem crossing into an energy state of different (usually higher) spin multiplicity (see term symbol), usually a triplet state. As a result, the excited electron can become trapped in the triplet state with only "forbidden" transitions available to return to the lower energy singlet state. These transitions, although "forbidden", will still occur in quantum mechanics but are kinetically unfavored and thus progress at significantly slower time scales. Most phosphorescent compounds are still relatively fast emitters, with triplet decay-times in the order of milliseconds.

Common examples include the phosphor coatings used in fluorescent lamps, where phosphorescence on the order of milliseconds or longer is useful for filling in the "off-time" between AC current cycles, helping to reduce "flicker". Phosphors with faster decay times are used in applications like the pixels excited by free electrons (cathodoluminescence) in cathode-ray tube television-sets, which are slow enough to allow the formation of a picture as the electron beam scans the screen, but fast enough to prevent the frames from blurring together. Even substances commonly associated with fluorescence may in fact be prone to phosphorescence, such as the liquid dyes found in highlighter pens, which is a common problem in liquid dye lasers. The onset of phosphorescence in this case can sometimes be reduced or delayed significantly by the use of triplet-quenching agents.

Equation

where S is a singlet and T a triplet whose subscripts denote states (0 is the ground state, and 1 the excited state). Transitions can also occur to higher energy levels, but the first excited state is denoted for simplicity.

Persistent phosphorescence

Solid materials typically come in two main types: crystalline and amorphous. In either case, a lattice or network of atoms and molecules form. In crystals, the lattice is a very neat, uniform assembly. However, nearly all crystals have defects in the stacking sequence of these molecules and atoms. A vacancy defect, where an atom is simply missing from its place, leaving an empty "hole", is one type of defect. Sometimes atoms can move from place to place within the lattice, creating Schottky defects or Frenkel defects. Other defects can occur from impurities in the lattice. For example, when a normal atom is substituted by a different atom of much larger or smaller size, a substitutional defect occurs, while an interstitial defect occurs when a much smaller atom gets trapped in the "interstices", or the spaces between atoms. In contrast, amorphous materials have no "long-range order" (beyond the space of a few atoms in any direction), thus by definition are filled with defects.

When a defect occurs, depending on the type and material, it can create a hole, or a "trap". For example, a missing oxygen atom from a zinc oxide compound creates a hole in the lattice, surrounded by unbound zinc-atoms. This creates a net force or attraction that can be measured in electron-volts. When a high-energy photon strikes one of the zinc atoms, its electron absorbs the photon and is thrown out into a higher orbit. The electron may then enter the trap and be held in place (out of its normal orbit) by the attraction. To trigger the release of the energy, a random spike in thermal energy is needed of sufficient magnitude to boost the electron out of the trap and back into its normal orbit. Once in orbit, the electron's energy can drop back to normal (ground state) resulting in the release of a photon.

The release of energy in this way is a completely random process, governed mostly by the average temperature of the material versus the "depth" of the trap, or how many electron-volts it exerts. A trap that has a depth of 2.0 electron-volts would require a great amount of thermal energy (very high temperatures) to overcome the attraction, while at a depth of 0.1 electron-volts very little heat (very cold temperatures) are needed for the trap to even hold an electron. Higher temperatures may cause the faster release of energy, resulting in a brighter yet short-lived emission, while lower temperatures may produce dimmer but longer-lasting glows. Temperatures that are too hot or cold, depending on the substance, may not allow the accumulation or release of energy at all. The ideal depth of trap for persistent phosphorescence at room temperature is typically between 0.6 and 0.7 electron-volts. If the phosphorescent quantum yield is high, that is, if the substance has a large number of traps of the correct depth, these substances will release significant amounts of light over long time scales, creating so-called "glow in the dark" materials.

Persistent phosphorescence is the mechanism of most anything commonly referred to as glow in the dark. Typical uses include toys, frisbees and balls, safety signs, paints and markings, make-ups, art and décor, and a variety of other uses.

Chemiluminescence

Some examples of glow-in-the-dark materials do not glow by phosphorescence. For example, glow sticks glow due to a chemiluminescent process which is commonly mistaken for phosphorescence. In chemiluminescence, an excited state is created via a chemical reaction. The light emission tracks the kinetic progress of the underlying chemical reaction. The excited state will then transfer to a dye molecule, also known as a sensitizer or fluorophor, and subsequently fluoresce back to the ground state.

Materials

Common pigments used in phosphorescent materials include zinc sulfide and strontium aluminate. Use of zinc sulfide for safety related products dates back to the 1930s.

The development of strontium aluminate pigments in 1993 was spurred on by the need to find a substitute for glow-in-the-dark materials with high luminance and long phosphorescence, especially those that used promethium. This led to the discovery by Yasumitsu Aoki (Nemoto & Co.) of materials with luminance approximately 10 times greater than zinc sulfide and phosphorescence approximately 10 times longer. This has relegated most zinc sulfide based products to the novelty category. Strontium aluminate based pigments are now used in exit signs, pathway marking, and other safety related signage.

Since both phosphorescence (transition from T1 to S0) and the generation of T1 from an excited singlet state (e.g., S1) via intersystem crossing (ISC) are spin-forbidden processes, most organic materials exhibit insignificant phosphorescence as they mostly fail to populate the excited triplet state, and, even if T1 is formed, phosphorescence is most frequently outcompeted by non-radiative pathways. One strategy to enhance the ISC and phosphorescence is the incorporation of heavy atoms, which increase spin-orbit coupling (SOC). Additionally, the SOC (and therefore the ISC) can be promoted by coupling n-π* and π-π* transitions with different angular momenta, also known as Mostafa El-Sayed's rule. Such transitions are typically exhibited by carbonyl or triazine derivatives, and most organic room-temperature phosphorescent (ORTP) materials incorporate such moieties.   In turn, to inhibit competitive non-radiative deactivation pathways, including vibrational relaxation and oxygen quenching and triplet-triplet annihilations, organic phosphors have to be embedded in rigid matrices such as polymers, and molecular solids (crystals, covalent organic frameworks, and others).

Uses 

In 1974 Becky Schroeder was given a US patent for her invention of the "Glow Sheet" which used phosphorescent lines under writing paper to help people write in low-light conditions.

Glow in the dark material is added to the plastic blend used in injection molds to make some disc golf discs, which allow the game to be played at night.

Often clock faces of watches are painted with phosphorencent colours. Therefore, they can be used in absolute dark environments for several hours after having been exposed to bright light.

A common use of Phosphorescence is decoration. Stars made of glow-in-the-dark plastic are placed on walls, ceilings, or hanging from strings make a room look like the night sky. Other objects like figurines, cups, posters, lamp fixtures, toys & bracelet beads may also glow. Using blacklights makes these things glow brightly, common at raves, bedrooms, theme parks & festivals.

Shadow wall 
A shadow wall is created when a light flashes upon a person or object in front of a phosphorescent screen which temporarily captures the shadow. The screen or wall is painted with a glow-in-the-dark product that contains phosphorescent compounds. Publicly, these shadow walls can be found at certain science museums.

See also
 Luminous gemstones
 Luminous paint
 Microsphere
 Persistent luminescence
 Phosphor
 Phosphoroscope
 Tritium

References

External links 

Luminescence
Phosphors and scintillators
Spectroscopy